During the 2019–20 season, SC Heerenveen participated in the Eredivisie and the KNVB Cup. Due to the COVID-19 pandemic, the Eredivisie season was abandoned with Heerenveen in 10th place. They were knocked out in the quarter-finals of the KNVB Cup, losing 1–0 at home to Feyenoord.

Competitions

Overview

Eredivisie

League table

Results summary

Results by round

Matches
The Eredivisie schedule was announced on 14 June 2019. The 2019–20 season was abandoned on 24 April 2020, due to the coronavirus pandemic in the Netherlands.

KNVB Cup

Player Transfers

Players In

Players Out

References

SC Heerenveen seasons
Dutch football clubs 2019–20 season